The Insurgency in Manipur is an ongoing armed conflict between India and a number of separatist rebel groups, taking place in the state of Manipur. The Insurgency in Manipur is part of the wider Insurgency in Northeast India; it combines elements of a national liberation war as well as an ethnic conflict.

Background
Manipur's long tradition of independence can be traced to the foundation of the Kangleipak State in 33 AD. Before that, the land was not unified under a single power. The Kingdom of Manipur was conquered by Great Britain following the brief Anglo-Manipur War of 1891, becoming a British protectorate.

Manipur became a part of India on 21 October 1949. However, only after violent protests, it became a separate state in 1972. Manipur's incorporation into the Indian state soon led to the formation of a number of insurgent organisations, seeking the creation of an independent state within the borders of Manipur, and dismissing the merger with India as involuntary.

History 
The first separatist faction, known as United National Liberation Front (UNLF), was founded on 24 November 1964. However, they did not take armed action until 1991. Between 1977 and 1980, the People's Liberation Army of Manipur (PLA), People's Revolutionary Party of Kangleipak (PREPAK) and the Kangleipak Communist Party (KCP), were formed, immediately joining the war.

On 8 September 1980, Manipur was declared an area of disturbance, when the Indian Government imposed the Armed Forces (Special Powers) Act, 1958 on the region; the act currently remains in force.

The parallel rise of Naga nationalism in neighbouring Nagaland led to the emergence of National Socialist Council of Nagaland (NSCN) activities in Manipur. Clashes between the Isak-Muivah and Khaplang factions of NSCN further aggravated tensions, as Kuki tribals began creating their own guerrilla groups in order to protect their interests from alleged Naga violations. Other ethnic groups such as Paite, Vaiphei, Pangals and Hmars followed suit establishing militant groups. The rise of tribal militias culminated in ethnic violence that  took place during the 1990s.

Current scenario
In contrast with the other insurgencies in NorthEast, Manipur-based militants are characterised by a low level of defections and a well organised intelligence network. They have also avoided targeting local police personnel, thus aiming to secure popular support.

Extortion remains the main source of funding for militant groups. Hindu Temples, educational institutions and businesses are known to have been targeted with illegal taxation. As many as 26 permanent tax collection checkpoints have been set up on the NH-39 and NH-53 National Highways. Militants have also resorted to abducting children and later employing them as Child soldiers. The illegal taxation is done through posts that can be found alongside the NH-39 and NH-53 highways. The taxation is very high compared to the local police excise duties. The effect of these taxations are largely felt by the drivers transporting oil along the highways from Assam to Manipur.

Timeline

The following is an incomplete list of events relating to the insurgency in Manipur. Most of these events cannot be independently verified because news journalists usually have very limited access to reaching the areas where the fighting take place.

 4 July 2000, 18 insurgents surrendered to the authorities of Imphal in the presence of Manipur Chief Minister Nipamacha Singh.
 18 September 2001, the Indian military killed 5 PLA members during a shootout in the Khoupum valley, Tamenglong district.
 10 February 2003, a KYKL ambush leads to the death of 5 Border Security Force personnel, in Leingangtabi along the Imphal-Moreh road.
 16 January 2005, security forces uncovered a PLA camp in Theogtang Zoukanou, Churachandpur district. A total of 76 rifles, 20 small arms, and large amounts of ammunition were seized.
 30 June 2005, 5 policemen and 4 PLA rebels were slain in a clash, in Thangjng Ching, Churachandpur district. A radio set, weapons, as well as documentation were confiscated from the dead guerrillas.
 17 August 2007, police arrested 12 rebels from the official residences of three Members of the Legislative Assembly in Imphal.
 31 November 2010, authorities detained UNLF chairman Rajkumar Meghen, the incident took place in Motihari, Bihar.
 15 April  2011, a NSCN-IM ambush resulted in the death of 8 people and the injury of 6 others, the victims belonged to the Manipur Legislative Assembly and the Manipur police. The incident took place in Riha, Yeingangpokpi 12 km from Imphal after the then MLA Wungnaoshang Keishing conference meeting, Ukhrul district.
 1 August 2011, 5 people were killed and 8 others injured when National Socialist Council of Nagaland-Isak Muivah rebels detonated a bomb outside a barber shop in the Sanghakpam Bazaar, Imphal.
 30 April 2012, 103 rebels belonging to UNLF, PULF, KYKL, PREPAK, KNLF,  KCP,  PLA,  UNPC,  NSCN-IM,  NSCN-K, UPPK and KRPA and KRF, surrendered before the Chief Minister Ibobi Singh during a ceremony at Mantripukhri in the Imphal West District.
 14 September 2013, an IED detonated in a tent housing migrant workers in the city of Imphal, killing at least 9 and injuring 20 people.
 20 February 2015, security forces conducted a number of raids in the areas of Wangjing and Khongtal, arresting 5 PREPAK cadres.
 23 May 2015, security forces carried out a joint operation in the village of Hingojang, Senapati district. Three rebels were killed, and one was detained after the rebels offered armed resistance.
 4 June 2015, guerrillas ambushed a military convoy in Chandel district, killing 18 soldiers and wounding 15 others. UNLFW claimed responsibility for the attack.
 9 June 2015, operators of the 21st Para SF Battalion of the Indian army carried out a cross border operation into Myanmar, which resulted in the death of approximately 20 rebels including those who attacked an army convoy on 4 June. Commandos went a few kilometers inside the Myanmar territory to destroy two camps of insurgents hiding there after their attacks in Manipur and Arunachal Pradesh on 4 June by NSCN(K) and KYKL outfits.
 22 May 2016, rebels ambushed and killed six Indian paramilitary soldiers in Manipur, India near the northeastern region bordering Myanmar.
 13 November 2021, rebels ambushed a convoy belonging to Assam Rifles, killing five Indian soldiers and two civilians in Churachandpur district, Manipur. The deceased also included an Indian army colonel and his family. Indian police suspect that rebels belonging to People's Liberation Army of Manipur (PLA) were responsible for the ambush.

See also
 Human rights abuses in Manipur
 Child soldiers in India
 Naxalite–Maoist insurgency
 Separatist movements of India
 Insurgency in Northeast India

References

Civil wars involving the states and peoples of Asia
Wars involving India
Wars involving Myanmar
Military history of India
Military history of Myanmar
2000s conflicts
2010s conflicts
Conflicts in 2016
2000s in India
2010s in India
Insurgencies in Asia